Ellen Marx (born February 22, 1939) is a French-German visual artist and author of reference books about color.

Biography 
Marx was born in Saarbrücken, Germany, where she studied visual research and graphic design from 1957 to 1962 at the Staatliche Werkkunstschule, Saarbrücken notably with professor Oskar Holweck, an artist belonging to the ZERO group in Germany (Günther Uecker, Otto Piene, Heinz Mack). His work and his teaching would have a profound influence on her own work.
In 1962 Ellen Marx went to Paris and two years later established an atelier 40 km from Paris where she still lives and works.
After the research work of E.Chevreul, Johannes Itten and Josef Albers, Marx has quantified objectively, for the first time, color relativity in her book Optical Color and Simultaneity. In parallel to the publication of the book in 1983, a solo exhibition took place at the Centre Georges Pompidou in Paris. The color reliefs in this exhibition were interactive and changed constantly with the view point of the spectator. Numerous other group and solo exhibitions were held in Europe, notably Relief Concrete in Germany today with the German artists of Concrete Art in the Modern Gallery of the Museum of the Saar, Germany in 1981. In 1989 Marx's French editor Pierre Zech published in the collection "Le Temps Apprivoisé" her book "Méditer la couleur" which examines in great detail the phenomenon of successive contrast.

Marx was invited to be the Keynote Address Speaker of the International Conference on Color Education  which was organized by the University of Art and Design in Helsinki and which showed in parallel her work in an exhibition alongside paintings by Josef Albers. Since 2000 she has been conceiving her paintings with the computer.

Bibliography

Ellen Marx: Les contrastes de la couleur Dessain et Tolra, Paris 1973,  
English translation The contrast of colors New York, Van Nostrand Reinhold 1973,   According to WorldCat, the book is held in 290   libraries    
German translation, Die Farbkontraste : Eine anschauliche Einführung in die Gesetzmässigkeiten der Farbe.  
Dutch translation De kleurkontrasten 
Japanese translation 色彩の対比 / Shikisai no taih OCLC 703800883 
Ellen Marx: Couleur Optique Dessain et Tolra, Paris 1983 - 
German translation  Farbintegration und Simultankontrast Muster Schmidt Verlag, Zürich, Göttingen 1989 
Ellen Marx: Optical Color and Simultaneity, Van Nostrand Reinhold, New-York,   According to WorldCat, the book is held in  347  libraries  
Ellen Marx  Méditer La Couleur.  Paris: P. Zech, 1989

References

 
1)"Papier als künstlerisches Medium" Edition Galerie St.Johann Saarbrücken, 
2)Quantified Color-Relativity in "Ellen Marx: Optical Color and Simultaneity", Van Nostrand Reinhold, New-York 1983  
3)Solo-exhibition in the magazine of the CNAC N°16, juillet-aout 1983
4)"Relief Konkret in Deutschland heute" 
5)Experiments of the successive contrast in Ellen Marx: "Méditer la Couleur", Le Temps Apprivoisé, Paris 1989 
6)Lecture of Ellen Marx "The Three Fundamental Color Syntheses - Additive, Subtractive, Integration - an Experience of Meditating Color" in the book of Harald Arnkil:"Aspects of Color" University of Art and Design, Helsinki 1995 

1939 births
Living people
German women artists
German women writers